Virginia's 87th House of Delegates district elects one of 100 seats in the Virginia House of Delegates, the lower house of the state's bicameral legislature. District 87 has been represented by Democrat Suhas Subramanyam since 2020.

Elections 
In 2015, John Bell, an Air Force veteran, was elected by a margin of only 320 votes, so this district was considered vulnerable to turnover in 2017. Bell was challenged by the Republican Subba Kolla, who immigrated from India in the 1990s and became a citizen in 2008. Kolla has stated, "I believe that the government that governs least, governs best." Late in the race, both candidates had raised significant funds (Bell $627,000 to Kolla's $524,600 as of November 2, 2017), but Bell defeated Kolla 61.73% to 38.04%.

District officeholders

Elections

References

External links
 

Virginia House of Delegates districts